Sege is a town located in the Greater Accra Region of Ghana, it is the district capital of Ada West District. According to the Ghana Statistical Service's 2010 Population and Housing Census, the population of Sege was 5,990.

References

Populated places in the Greater Accra Region